The term rural ghetto describes the influx of poverty and neglect in the small towns of Midwestern, South Central United States, Southeastern United States and Northeastern United States.

According to an April 1993 review of the book by Fred Magdoff, rural ghettos are often "omitted from most people's conception of poverty." Generally, "rural poverty is less visually dramatic than urban poverty--poorly insulated mobile homes and weather-beaten single family houses look almost quaint compared to urban tenements." Magdoff goes on to point out the reality of poverty in rural areas does not fit a common conception of idyllic farms.

Some of the trends driving the rural ghetto phenomenon:
 A speculation-driven bubble in land prices. 
 A push by agricultural officials to have farmers produce as much grain as possible, the "fencerow to fencerow" mandate.
 The bank crisis, partially caused by banks pushing too-easy-to-get credit on both farm and non-farm businesses.
 The decline in the number of non-farm jobs and the increase of low-paying service-sector jobs.
 The opening of large malls on the outskirts of towns.
 Reagan-era reduction in farm aid to states, cities and towns when aid was most needed.

In contrast to urban areas and inner city neighborhoods, most of the "rural ghettos" are mostly white, though a large number of predominantly black towns in the Southern U.S. fit this particular profile. Jackson County, Kentucky in the Appalachia region was featured on an April 2009 segment on ABC news program 20/20 about rural poverty.
Also to note, many Indian Reservations, home to Native Americans such as Pine Ridge and Standing Rock, South Dakota, and Hispanic-majority slums known as colonias (see also barrio), most notably in South Texas and Central California, are referred to as "rural ghettos." Often these areas are isolated geographically from main economic centers.

See also
Poverty in the United States
Reservation poverty
Rural development
Rural flight
Rural sociology

References

Further reading
 No. 1 Hard: Notes on the Emptying Out of North Dakota by Jennifer Vogel
 National Geographic, The Emptied Prairie, about the slow painful death of North Dakota

Rural economics
Rural geography
Poverty in the United States